Y. Ramavaram (Yarlagadda Ramavaram) is a village in Y. Ramavaram Mandal, which is located in Alluri Sitharama Raju district of Andhra Pradesh state, India.

References

 Villages in East Godavari district